Kanisha Sluis (born 12 August 1996) is a Dutch-Curaçaoan model and beauty pageant titleholder who crowned as Miss Curaçao 2015 and represented her country at the Miss Universe 2015 pageant where she placed in the Top 10 and Top 20 Miss Grand International 2022.

Pageantry

Miss Curaçao 2015
On 13 June 2015 Kanisha was crowned Miss Curaçao 2015 and was awarded the Miss Playa Award at the Santa Barbara Beach & Golf Resort, Curaçao. Seven contestants vied for the crown.

Miss Universe 2015
As Miss Curaçao 2015, Kanisha competed at the Miss Universe 2015 pageant, where she made it to the Top 10 and placed 8th overall. In 1968 Curaçao's Anne Marie Braafheid became first runner-up at the Miss Universe pageant, making her the first black woman in the world to attain a similar position at a grand slam pageant. Furthermore, the island has placed in 1976 (top 12), 1991 (top 10), 1997 (top 6), 2015 (top 10: Kanisha Sluis), 2018 (top 10), 2020 (top 21) and 2022 (top 5).

Miss Grand International 2022
On August 18, 2022, the Curaçao Beauty Pageant Committee announced that Sluis will be the representative of Curaçao at Miss Grand International 2022 in Indonesia. She represented the country and placed in the Top 20.

References

External links
Official Miss Curaçao Organization website

Living people
Miss Universe 2015 contestants
1996 births